Chetan Singh Jouramajra is an Indian politician, and a member of Aam Aadmi Party. He is Member of Legislative Assembly from Samana, was elected in 2022 Punjab assembly elections, and also serves as a president of Patiala district rural unit of the party. In 2019, he was shot saving a girl from kidnapping. In 2022, he won in Samana by margin of 39,713.

Early life 
Chetan Singh was born in 1967 to father Gurdev Singh.

Political career 
Chetan Singh was appointed the president of Patiala district rural unit of Aam Aadmi Party. 

In March 2019, Chetan Singh was shot by unidentified assailants while he tried to prevent kidnapping a girl in Tarn Taran Sahib. He was shot near neck, and was admitted to a hospital in Amritsar. Arvind Kejriwal, Chief Minister of Delhi questioned the law & order situation of Punjab, following the incident. On 15 March 2019, AAP delegation met Punjab CEO, Karuna Raju regarding the incident. In October 2020, his images from the incident were linked to another incident and went viral in Shahjahanpur, Uttar Pradesh.

On 10 December 2021, he was announced as the candidate for Member of the Punjab Legislative Assembly from Samana Assembly constituency in the 2022 Punjab Legislative Assembly elections. He filed the nomination from the constituency on 28 January 2022. He secured 74,375 votes, and defeated cabinet ministers Surjit Singh Rakhra of SAD with margin of 39,713 votes, and Rajinder Singh of INC. The Aam Aadmi Party gained a strong 79% majority in the sixteenth Punjab Legislative Assembly by winning 92 out of 117 seats in the 2022 Punjab Legislative Assembly election. MP Bhagwant Mann was sworn in as Chief Minister on 16 March 2022.

He has been appointed Cabinet Minister in Government of Punjab, India on July 04, 2022.

Member of Legislative Assembly 
Committee assignments of Punjab Legislative Assembly
Member (2022–23) House Committee
Member (2022–23) Committee on Agriculture and its allied activities

Cabinet Minister
5 MLAs including Chetan Singh Jauramajra were inducted into the cabinet and their swearing in ceremony took place on 4 July 2022. On 5 July, Bhagwant Mann announced the expansion of his cabinet of ministers with five new ministers to the departments of Punjab state government. Chetan Singh Jauramajra was among the inducted ministers and was given the charge of following departments.

On 7 January 2023, during the cabinet reschuffle, he was given the charge of new following portfolios.

Punjab Health Minister 
On 5 July Jauramajra was appointed the health Minister in the Punjab cabinet.

Jauramajra had received multiple complaints about the lack of cleanliness in the hospital wards. On July 29, 2022, he visited the Baba Farid University of Health Sciences (BFUHS) for an inspection accompanied by journalists. During the visit Raj Bahadur, the vice chancellor was asked to lie down on the bed for patients to which he complied. The poor condition of the mattress is then shown. Bahadur resigned next day. In August 2022 he ordered to take strict actions against food adulteration.

Electoral performance

References 

 

Aam Aadmi Party politicians from Punjab, India
1967 births
Punjab, India MLAs 2022–2027
Living people
People from Patiala district